The Foreign Births Register is an official register of foreign births with Irish citizenship that is kept by the Department of Foreign Affairs in Dublin. A Foreign Births Entry Book is also maintained in every Irish diplomatic mission and consular office, the contents of which are from time to time transcribed into the Foreign Births Register.

The system of citizenship registration was established by the Irish Nationality and Citizenship Act, 1956. A person born outside Ireland to an Irish-citizen parent who was also born outside Ireland may acquire Irish citizenship by registering onto the Foreign Births Register or a Foreign Births Entry Book. Such people become Irish citizens from the date of registration, or for those registered on or before 30 June 1986, from their date of birth, or 17 July 1956 if they were born before that date. Once a person is on the foreign births registration certificate, any children they have who are born after this registration date are entitled to Irish citizenship by also registering on the Foreign Births Register (children born outside Ireland to Irish-citizen parents born outside Ireland do not become Irish citizens automatically). Thus, the Irish citizenship of future generations born abroad can be preserved as long as the youngest generation registers onto the Foreign Births Register before having any children.

Once entered, a certified copy of the entry is issued, which takes the form of an A4 certificate bearing the signature of a senior consular official and the stamp of authenticity from the authority responsible for having made the entry e.g. Irish diplomatic mission. This certificate is printed on specially produced security paper incorporating a UV reactive Harp watermark and may be used as proof of Irish citizenship when applying for a passport without any further proof of citizenship being required. A statutory fee is charged for access to this facility which varies depending on the issuing authority. If the application is made in Dublin at the Department of Foreign Affairs, the current fee is €278 if over 18 and €153 if under.  Fees outside Ireland vary from embassy to embassy, but is generally an equivalent to €278 in the local currency.

Due to Covid-19 and Brexit Applications for Foreign Birth Registration can take roughly 24 months to process from the date of receipt of a complete application with all the required supporting documentation.

See also
Irish nationality law

References

Irish nationality law